Ghaseetpur Sohalian is a village in Mirpur (District of Azad Kashmir) Pakistan.

Demography 

Ghaseetpur used to be on the banks of the River Jehlum but was moved back away from the River due to persistent flooding. In fact Ghaseet actually translates as dragging - as in dragging away from the banks of the river. 
According to the 1998 census, its population was 625. Much of the village has connections to the U.K. (United Kingdom) where many of its residents reside. 
Villagers first left for Britain during the construction of the Mangla Dam. 
The building of the dam displaced over 110,000 people who had to be relocated elsewhere. 
Land was distributed to these people in other parts of Kashmir and some of those affected by the dam were given work permits for Britain by the Government of Pakistan. 
These workers helped Britain during the Industrial revolution and mainly worked in the mills of Northern England. 
Some managed to pool money together and eventually started businesses and became quite wealthy. 
This wealth can be seen in some of the residences and ownership of land and business in Mirpur. 
The villagers are mainly loyal to the Barelvi sect of Islam. Although the villagers are muslim there is a heavy influence of their ancestry which comes from Sikhism and Hinduism. 
Weddings and other communal gatherings are undistinguishable from one that is performed in India by Hindus. 
The Hindu caste system is still used in the village and dictates hierarchy. 
Rajputs are the main caste of the village, which is about 95 percent. 
The main occupation of the residents is farming. The Monsoon which flows down from the Himalayas allows the cultivation of Rice for half the year and wheat the other half. 
There are many new builds in this village with some quite extravagant Villas 3 stories high. 
Many prominent local figures live in this particular Village and are highly respected thorough the region and beyond.
The main Clan in the village actually has a book written about their ancient history. 
On the back cover of this book is the verified traced roots of this clan ending with the sons of Ali Zaman and their children most notable of these being Raja Imran Mukhtar. 
The clans heritage can be traced back to being the ancestrial owners if the Koh-i-Noor.

References 

Populated places in Mirpur District